Ira Madison III (born July 28, 1986) is an American television writer and podcaster. He is the main host of the Crooked Media podcast Keep It! He is a former critic at The Daily Beast, GQ Magazine, and other publications.

Early life 
Madison attended Marquette University High School, then attended Loyola University Chicago as an undergraduate, then New York University's Tisch School of the Arts for a master's degree in Dramatic Writing.

Career 
Madison worked as a writer for MTV News and BuzzFeed in the early 2010s. He has since written for various publications, including Variety, GQ Magazine, and The Daily Beast. Madison was named one of the "most reliably hilarious and incisive cultural critics writing now" by Nylon in 2016. Nylon also named Madison to its 2016 list of "The 25 Best Things We Read Online In 2016" for his essay on Donald Trump's political rise. Madison co-hosted a podcast at MTV News with Doreen St. Félix in 2016 called Speed Dial with Ira and Doreen, that focused on music, pop culture, and race. In April 2017, Madison was featured in the documentary The Culture of Proximity. In January 2018, Crooked Media launched the podcast, Keep It!, a show about pop culture and politics, which is hosted by Madison.

Madison was a writer on the Netflix series Daybreak. He has also written for Q-Force.

Twitter suspension 
In November 2020, Madison pranked Twitter by changing his name to Beto O'Rourke and writing "I'll drop my nudes if Texas goes blue". He was campaigning for Joe Biden in the 2020 United States presidential election. He went on to tweet “es grande”. Madison was suspended from Twitter for impersonating O'Rourke.

References

External links
 
 Keep It! episode archive
 Interview with Ira Madison III on The Late Show with Stephen Colbert (December 13, 2018)

1986 births
Living people
Writers from Milwaukee
21st-century American non-fiction writers
New York University alumni
American music critics
MTV News
21st-century American male writers
American male non-fiction writers
Marquette University High School alumni